Kento Yoshida (born 10 December 1992) is a Japanese right-handed sabre fencer and Olympian. He competed in the 2020 Tokyo Olympic Games.

Medal Record

Asian Championship

Grand Prix

References

1992 births
Living people
People from Koganei, Tokyo
Fencers at the 2020 Summer Olympics
Japanese male sabre fencers
Olympic fencers of Japan
Fencers at the 2018 Asian Games